May You Be Held is the fourth studio album by Canadian-American metal band Sumac. The album was released on October 2, 2020 through Thrill Jockey, pushed back from its original release date of September 18. To promote the album, Sumac released the track "The Iron Chair" for online streaming in July 2020. Sumac asked Thrill Jockey to refrain from posting the album to the music streaming platform Spotify due to what the band referred to as CEO Daniel Ek's "pretty repugnant statements" made earlier in 2020 about artists not performing well on the site.

May You Be Held was recorded over three years (2017–2019) and recorded at three different recordings studios, primarily in Washington state. Kurt Ballou (Converge) who produced Sumac's What One Becomes (2016) and Love in Shadow (2018) returned to mix the album, while it was recorded by Matt Bayles (Isis, Botch).

Track listing

Personnel 
Sumac
 Brian Cook – bass
 Aaron Turner – guitars, vocals
 Nick Yacyshyn – drums, percussion

Additional musicians
 Faith Coloccia – organ on "Laughter and Silence"

Production
 Kurt Ballou – mixing, additional recording
 Matt Bayles – recording
 Matt Colton – mastering
 Aaron Turner – additional recording
 Nicholas Wilbur – assistant engineering

Artwork
 Aaron Turner – artwork, design

References 

2020 albums
Sumac (band) albums
Thrill Jockey albums
Albums produced by Matt Bayles